Mia Sarapochiello (born June 19, 1967), known professionally as Mia Sara, is a retired American actress. She made her film debut as Princess Lili in the fantasy film Legend (1985), and had her breakthrough starring as Sloane Peterson in the comedy film Ferris Bueller's Day Off (1986). She also portrayed Melissa Walker in the science fiction film Timecop (1994), which won her the Saturn Award for Best Supporting Actress.

Early life
Sara was born Mia Sarapochiello in Brooklyn Heights, Brooklyn, New York, New York. She is the daughter of Diana, a stylist and photographer, and Jerome Sarapochiello, a photographer and artist. The family is Roman Catholic tradition and of Italian descent. She attended St. Ann's School, in Brooklyn.

Career
Sara's debut role was Princess Lili in Ridley Scott's 1985 fairy-tale film Legend, alongside Tom Cruise. Playing the role of Ferris Bueller's girlfriend, Sloane Peterson, in the 1986 blockbuster film Ferris Bueller's Day Off made her even more popular. She also appeared in the 1987 miniseries Queenie, a roman à clef on actress Merle Oberon, as well as 1992's A Stranger Among Us, directed by Sidney Lumet. In 1994, she starred opposite Jean-Claude Van Damme in the blockbuster Timecop, for which she won the Saturn Award for Best Supporting Actress. She also played the part of Molly Connor in The Impossible Elephant (2001).  Also in 2001, she acted in Jack and the Beanstalk: The Real Story, directed by Brian Henson (eldest son of Muppets creator Jim Henson).  

Her television roles have included Annie Knox in the science fiction series Time Trax (1993–94) and Dr. Harleen Quinzel in the short-lived WB Network series Birds of Prey (2002–03).

Personal life
In March 1996, Sara married Jason Connery, son of Sean Connery, with whom she performed in Bullet to Beijing. In June 1997, they had a son, Dashiell Quinn Connery. The couple divorced in 2002.

In 2005, Sara had a daughter with Brian Henson, Amelia Jane Henson. Sara and Henson married in 2010.

Filmography

Films

Television

Awards and nominations

References

External links
 

1967 births
Living people
20th-century American actresses
21st-century American actresses
Actresses from New York City
American film actresses
American people of Italian descent
American television actresses
People from Brooklyn Heights
Saint Ann's School (Brooklyn) alumni
Henson family (show business)